César Augusto Filardi (born April 6, 1946 in São Paulo) is a former international backstroke swimmer from Brazil, who competed at one Summer Olympics for his native country.

At the 1968 Summer Olympics, in Mexico City, he swam the 100-metre backstroke and the 4×100-metre medley (along with José Fiolo, João Costa Lima Neto and José Aranha), not reaching the finals.

References

1946 births
Living people
Brazilian male backstroke swimmers
Swimmers at the 1968 Summer Olympics
Olympic swimmers of Brazil
Swimmers from São Paulo